Dalečín is a municipality and village in Žďár nad Sázavou District in the Vysočina Region of the Czech Republic. It has about 600 inhabitants.

Administrative parts
Villages od Hluboké and Veselí are administrative parts of Dalečín.

Etymology
The name is probably derived from personal name Daleca.

Geography
It lies in the Upper Svratka Highlands. The village of Dalečín is located in the meander of the Svratka River.

Part of the Vír Reservoir is located in the municipal territory. The reservoir was built in 1947–1958 and includes the area of the village of Chudobín, which was flooded during the construction of the reservoir.

History
The first mention of Dalečín from 1086, where it is referred to as Daletice, is considered forgery. The first reliable reference is from 1349. A castle and the Church of Saint James the Great are first mentioned in a deed from 1353. In 1390, a fortress in Dalečín is mentioned.

From 1353 until 1588, Dalečín was owned by the Pernštejn family. In 1588, Jan of Pernštejn sold the village to Pavel Katharyn of Kathar. In the following years, Dalečín often changed owners. After the Battle of White Mountain, Dalečín manor was confiscated to Vilém Dubský of Třebomyslice and sold to and Štěpán Schmidt of Freihofen. Dalečín became part of the Kunštát manor and remained part of it until the abolition of manorialism in 1848. The last owner was free lord Honrichs.

Demographics

Sights

Dalečín Castle is situated in the meander of the Svratka which protected it from three sides. Based on the architectural elements of the castle, it was built around 1340. The first written mention of the castle is from 1358 when it was passed to the Pernštejn family. Since the beginning of the 16th century the castle was probably a seat of robber knights. In 1519 the castle was devastated by an army. Since then, the castle is listed as desolate.

The Dalečín Chateau was built around 1590 by Pavel Katharyn of Kathar close to the deserted Dalečín Castle. The Renaissance chateau had a number of owners and at the end of 19th century it was rebuilt in the style of Tyrol cottage. The last owner from nobility was young countess Františka Coudenhove-Honrichs. In the 1919 land reform the chateau was confiscated by the state. However, the chateau and the castle were returned to Františka Coudenhove-Honrichs in 1924. She donated the chateau to Congregation of the Consolatory Sisters of the Jesus Divine Heart. In the early 1950s, it was again confiscated by the state. The chateau nowadays houses the municipal office.

The Church of Saint James the Great was built in 1358. In 1744, it was rebuilt in the Baroque style.

The Villa of Gustav Jarošek is an architecturally valuable house in the Functionalist style built in 1936–1939.

References

External links

Villages in Žďár nad Sázavou District